The 2023 Melbourne Storm season will be the 26th in the club's history, competing in the 2023 NRL season. The team is coached by Craig Bellamy, coaching the club for his 21st consecutive season. Melbourne Storm are also captained by Christian Welch who will be captain for the second consecutive season.

Season summary
 Preseason – New recruits from the 2022–23 season took part in Melbourne Storm IDQ camp for pre season before New Years. Tyran Wishart was awarded the IDQ Iron bar.
 2 January –  Ryan Papenhuyzen left Australia for a two-week training camp in Philadephia with Bill Knowles, as part of his recovery from injury. Papenhuyzen was six months into his recovery from a broken patella, but was yet to commence running. Knowles a sports reconditioning and athletic development specialist, had previously worked with NRL players Latrell Mitchell and Tom Trbojevic.
 22 January – Club chairperson Matt Trip suggested in an interview that the 2023 season would be coach Craig Bellamy's last season in the position before retirement. Tripp was quoted as saying "we chatted pre-Christmas and he was more 'no' than 'yes', but that might change as we get towards round one."
 5 February – After earning selection for the Māori All Stars as the only Melbourne Storm representative, Nelson Asofa-Solomona withdraws from the annual match played in Rotutua, citing a heavy training load after only resuming training in January.
 9 February – Tui Kamikamica extends his contract with the club for a further two years to remain in Melbourne until the end of the 2025 season.
 12 February – In the club's first hit out for the season in the NRL's pre-season challenge, an inexperienced Melbourne squad go down 24–32 to the Sydney Roosters in front of almost 8,000 fans at GMHBA Stadium in Geelong. A broken arm to  Justin Olam saw him leave the field after only a few minutes, but the performances of Victorian fullback Sualauvi Fa'alogo and Tyran Wishart were promising. Melbourne would gain two bonus points in the pre-season challenge format which rewards attacking play.
 19 February – After an error-ridden first half, Melbourne score 24 unanswered points to take a 24–6 win over New Zealand Warriors in the club's final pre-season trial match. Tries to New Zealanders Will Warbrick, Eliesa Katoa and Nelson Asofa-Solomona setting up the win.
 22 February – CEO Justin Rodski announced the 2023 club leadership group, with Christian Welch named as sole club captain. Harry Grant, Jahrome Hughes and Cameron Munster were named as vice-captains.
 Round 1 – Harry Grant scores Melbourne's first ever "golden try" in the third minute of golden point extra time to clinch a 16–12 win over Parramatta Eels to open the 2023 NRL season. The win was Melbourne's 21st consecutive round one victory, also ending a four match losing streak against Parramatta. Will Warbrick and Bronson Garlick both made their NRL debuts, with Eliesa Katoa making his Storm debut. Cameron Munster returned to the field after half time, despite suffering a compound dislocation of his third finger on his right hand earlier in the match to inspire a second half comeback.
 9 March – Forwards Josh King and Lazarus Vaalepu sign new contracts to stay with Melbourne until the end of the 2025 NRL season. King had been made a member of the club's emerging leaders group in 2023 after joining the club for the 2022 season, while Vaalepu has joined the club on a train and trial contract for this season. Vaalepu will hold a development contract in 2024, joining the top 30 squad in 2025.
 Round 3 – In a high-scoring match, Gold Coast Titans win their first game over Melbourne at their home ground since 2013. Jonah Pezet made his NRL debut, scoring a try, with Tariq Sims also marking his Storm debut with a try.

Milestone games

Fixtures

Pre-season 

Source:

Regular season

Source:
  – Golden Point extra time
 (pen) – Penalty try

Ladder

Coaching staff
 Craig Bellamy – Head Coach
 Marc Brentnall – Assistant Coach
 Aaron Bellamy – Assistant Coach
 Ryan Hinchcliffe – Assistant Coach
 Todd Lowrie – Assistant Coach
 Frank Ponissi – General Manager - Football
 Billy Slater – Specialist Coach (Part-time)
 Cooper Cronk – Specialist Coach (Consultant)
 Joel Selwood – Leadership Coach
 Matt Duffie - Pathways Coach
 Tim Glasby - Recruitment Officer and Pathways Manager
 Adam Woolnough – Under-21s Head Coach
 Matt Church – Brisbane Tigers Feeder Club Coach
 Brad Henderson – Sunshine Coast Falcons Feeder Club Coach
Reference:

2023 squad
List current as of 20 March 2023

Player movements
Source:

Losses
 Jesse Bromwich to Dolphins
 Kenneath Bromwich to Dolphins
 Cooper Johns to Manly Sea Eagles
 Felise Kaufusi to Dolphins
 David Nofoaluma to Wests Tigers
 Brandon Smith to Sydney Roosters

Gains
 Joe Chan from Catalans Dragons
 Eliesa Katoa from New Zealand Warriors
 Aaron Pene from New Zealand Warriors
 Tariq Sims from St. George Illawarra Dragons

Representative honours
This table lists all players who have played a representative match in 2023.

Statistics

This table contains playing statistics for all Melbourne Storm players to have played in the 2023 NRL season.

 Statistics sources:

Scorers
Most points in a game: 18  
 Round 3 – Nick Meaney (2 tries, 5 goals) vs Gold Coast Titans

Most tries in a game: 2
 Round 3 – Nick Meaney vs Gold Coast Titans

Winning games

Highest score in a winning game: 16 points
 Round 1 vs Parramatta Eels
Lowest score in a winning game: 16 points
 Round 1 vs Parramatta Eels
Greatest winning margin: 4 points
 Round 1 vs Parramatta Eels
Greatest number of games won consecutively: 1

Losing games

Highest score in a losing game: 34 points
 Round 3 vs Gold Coast Titans
Lowest score in a losing game: 12 points
 Round 2 vs Canterbury-Bankstown Bulldogs
Greatest losing margin: 14 points
 Round 2 vs Canterbury-Bankstown Bulldogs
Greatest number of games lost consecutively: 2
 Rounds 2–3

Jerseys
In December 2020, Melbourne Storm announced a five-year sponsorship and apparel partnership agreement with British sportswear company, Castore. They will continue produce supporter wear and jerseys for season 2023.

Home

Revealed in December 2022, the 2023 home jersey sees the return of the colour purple as the primary colour. The design is similar to that worn in 2021-22 with front and back panels featuring a purple V pattern repeating all the way down the jersey, headed by a large purple V across the chest. Among the special features Castore has incorporated in the jersey are bright yellow lightning bolt design on the sides and the inclusion of a Big V logo on the inner collar as a continuation of the Our Home, Victoria acknowledgment which began during the 2020 season to honor Storm's home state. There is a small mark on the back of the jersey to recognise the club's 25th anniversary.

Away

The away jersey, worn when the home jersey creates a clash with the opposition, is also new design for 2023. The white jersey features a single purple centre stripe down the front of the jersey with purple trimming; it will be worn with white shorts (for the first time since 2014), and white socks with purple cuffs.

Heritage

In the club's first home game, Melbourne wore a replica design based on the club's first home jersey from 1998. The player's versions of the jersey had information about their counterpart from the 1998 first home game against North Sydney.

Junior competitions
In October 2022, Melbourne formalised a new partnership with NRL Victoria to rebrand the Victoria Thunderbolts Under-19 S. G. Ball Cup and Under-21 Jersey Flegg Cup teams to play under the Melbourne Storm brand. Both teams had been playing as the Thunderbolts since 2018, following the end of the NRL Under-20s competition. Melbourne Storm General Manager Football, Frank Ponissi saying "while the Thunderbolts have been a good development program for our local elite players, we want to build a system that delivers a stronger connection with Storm and provides the incentive for local players to one day play for Storm at AAMI Park. Not only will the SG Ball and Jersey Flegg teams play under our name, but players will wear Storm colours, train in Storm kit and have access to our coaches and staff throughout the year to help in their training and development."

Melbourne had previously entered a team in the S. G. Ball Cup from 2009–2014.

Storm Academy
On 6 December 2022, the club announced the first members of the relaunched Storm Academy, with players who will form the basis of the club's rebranded Jersey Flegg Cup team. The players were as follows:

Awards

Trophy Cabinet

Melbourne Storm Awards Night
 Cameron Smith Player of the Year:
 Billy Slater Rookie of the Year:
 Melbourne Storm Members' Player of Year:
 Melbourne Storm Most Improved:
 Melbourne Storm Best Back:
 Melbourne Storm Best Forward:
 Cooper Cronk Feeder Club Player of the Year:
 Mick Moore Club Person of the Year:
 Chairman’s Award:
 Darren Bell Medal (U21s Player of the Year):
 Greg Brentnall Young Achievers Award:
 Best Try:
 Life Member Inductees:

Dally M Awards Night

Rugby League Players’ Association Awards

Additional awards
 I Don't Quit Iron Bar: Tyran Wishart

Notes

References

Melbourne Storm seasons
Melbourne Storm season